Fellows of the Royal Society elected in 1795.

Fellows

 William Blane (1750–1835)
 Sylvester Douglas, Baron Glenbervie (1743–1823)
 Gregorio Fontana (1735–1803)
 Alberto Fortis (1741–1803)
 Hugh Gillan (d. 1798)
 Archibald Harrison
 George Heath (1745–1822), Headmaster of Eton School
 George Howard, 6th Earl of Carlisle (1773–1848)
 Benjamin Hutchinson (d. 1804)
 Martin Heinrich Klaproth (1743–1817)
 Thomas James Mathias (c.1754–1835)
 Matthew Montagu
 Barnaba Oriani (1752–1832)
 John Parker, 1st Earl of Morley (1772–1840)
 Christopher Pegge (1765–1822)
 William Petrie (1784–1816)
 Jacob Pleydell-Bouverie, 2nd Earl of Radnor (1750–1828)
 David Rittenhouse (1732–1796)
 Abraham Robertson (1751–1826)
 Johann Christian Daniel von Schreber (1739–1810)
 Matthew Smith (1739–1812), Captain of Tower of London
 August Ferdinand Veltheim (1741–1801)
 Samuel Young (1766–1826)

References

1795 in science
1795
1795 in Great Britain